The Men's 1500 metre freestyle competition of the 2016 FINA World Swimming Championships (25 m) was held on 8 and 9 December 2016.

Records
Prior to the competition, the existing world and championship records were as follows.

The following records were established during the competition:

Results

Heats
The heats were held at 12:31.

Final
The final was held at 18:37.

References

Men's 1500 metre freestyle